Hotson's mouse-like hamster (Calomyscus hotsoni) also known as Hotson's calomyscus or Hotson's brush-tailed mouse is a species of rodent in the family Calomyscidae.
It is endemic to southwestern Pakistan and southeastern Iran (Musser and Carleton, 2005; Norris et al., 2008).

Name
The species was named by Oldfield Thomas after John Ernest Buttery Hotson who collected the original 4 specimens in Balochistan in 1918.  The species had traditionally been called Hotson's mouse-like hamster because of the presumed relationship between members of the genus Calomyscus and the hamsters.  Musser and Carleton (1993) considered Calomyscus to be distinct enough from the hamsters to warrant a distinct subfamily.  Numerous molecular studies (Michaux et al., 2001; Jansa and Weksler, 2004; Steppan et al., 2004) have supported the distinctive nature of the genus, and they are currently recognized as belonging to a distinct family, Calomyscidae (Musser and Carleton, 2005).

In order to underscore that members of the genus Calomyscus are not related to hamsters, Musser and Carlton (2005) suggested the name Hotson's calomyscus, using the genus name as a common name.  Norris et al. (2008) agreed that the use of the term "hamster" should be avoided, but disagreed with the application of a genus name in place of a common name.  Although they preferred the use of a local name, they reported that the languages of southern Pakistan do not distinguish among small rodent species (see haraam).  Instead, Norris et al. (2008) proposed that the species be referred to as Hotson's brush-tailed mouse, identifying a major morphological feature of the genus.  Jordan et al. (2008) have since adopted this as the primary common name, but also list Hotson's mouse-like hamster (but not Hotson's Calomyscus).  As with most species of small mammal, common names are rarely used outside of checklists and field guides, and most researchers employ the binomial name, Calomyscus hotsoni.

Distribution and characteristics

Because it was only known from the 4 specimens of the type series at the time, Baillie (1996) categorized Hotson's brush-tailed mouse as endangered.  Musser and Carleton (2005 later referred 12 individuals collected by Gary Ranck in 1962 from southeastern Iran to this species.  Norris et al. (2008) reported collecting C. hotsoni in Panjgur District (5 individuals), near Shergart Fort in Dadu District (1 individual), Hingol National Park (1 individual), and near Wadh (2 individuals).  Currently Calomyscus hotsoni is present in 4 museums: the Bombay Museum of Natural History (3 individuals), the Field Museum (1 individual), the Smithsonian (12 individuals), and the Florida Museum of Natural History (9 individuals).  With new information suggesting the species was more widespread than previously thought, Jordan et al. (2008) listed the species as Least Concern.

Calomyscus hotsoni is smaller than the other species in Pakistan (C. baluchi), and has a smaller hind foot (Norris et al., 2008).  It has "black-tipped, pale yellow-brown pelage" (Norris et al., 2008:312).  The two species in Pakistan are distinguishable by several cranial characteristics and genetic evidence suggests they diverged roughly 2 million years ago (Norris et al., 2008).

Natural history

Calomyscus hotsoni is found at elevations ranging from 67–1890 meters (Jordan et al., 2008).  It tends to be found in rocky habitats in arid regions particularly in association with dwarf palms (Nannorrhops ritchiana).  Norris et al. (2008) report having captured Mus saxicola and Acomys dimidiatus in the same areas.

References

Jansa, S. A. and M. Weksler. 2004. Phylogeny of muroid rodents: relationships within and among major lineages as determined by IRBP gene sequences.  Molecular Phylogenetics and Evolution, 31:256-276.
Michaux, J., A. Reyes, and F. Catzeflis. 2001. Evolutionary history of the most speciose mammals: molecular phylogeny of muroid rodents. Molecular Biology and Evolution, 17:280-293.
Musser, G. G. and M. D. Carleton. 1993. Family Muridae. pp. 501–755 in Mammal Species of the World a Taxonomic and Geographic Reference. D. E. Wilson and D. M. Reeder eds. Smithsonian Institution Press, Washington D.C.
Musser, G. G. and M. D. Carleton. 2005. Superfamily Muroidea. pp. 894–1531 in Mammal Species of the World a Taxonomic and Geographic Reference. D. E. Wilson and D. M. Reeder eds. Johns Hopkins University Press, Baltimore.
Norris, R. W., C. A. Woods, and C. W. Kilpatrick. 2008.  Morphological and molecular definition of Calomyscus hotsoni (Rodentia: Muroidea: Calomyscidae).  Journal of Mammalogy, 89 (2):306-315.
Steppan, S. J., R. A. Adkins, and J. Anderson. 2004. Phylogeny and divergence date estimates of rapid radiations in muroid rodents based on multiple nuclear genes. Systematic Biology, 53:533-553.
 Thomas, Oldfield. 1920. 'Some new Mammals from Baluchistan and North-West India', Journal of the Bombay Natural History Society, vol. 26, no. 4, pp. 938–940.

Mouse-like hamsters
Mammals of Pakistan
Mouse-like Hamster, Hotson's
Mammals described in 1920
Taxa named by Oldfield Thomas
Taxonomy articles created by Polbot